Payconiq International S.A. is a Luxembourg-based company developing a mobile payment and payment processing platform, active in Belgium and Luxembourg. The company had the initial support of ING Bank, which was joined later by Belgian banks KBC Bank and Belfius, and launched its first minimum-viable product in Belgium, in 2015. The company will discontinue its services in the Netherlands on 1 January 2022. What started as a mobile payment app is today a fully-fledged platform offering multi-country payment solutions in Benelux, through different types of integration: stand-alone apps, bank app integrations and more.

Luxembourg 
Payconiq International has established its headquarters in Luxembourg through the acquisition of the Luxembourgish fintech startup Digicash Payments, in 2017. 

In 2019, the company has received its Payment Initiation Service license from the Luxembourgish regulator CSSF and some extra financing from its shareholders, amounting to EUR 20 million.  

In 2020, the five Digicash apps have been rebranded to Digicash by Payconiq, as the company made all its mobile solutions in the Benelux area interoperable. In 2021, the Digicash merchants have started migrating to the Payconiq platform.

Belgium 
Payconiq Belgium and the Belgian payment system  announced in March 2018 their intention to merge. The merger was finalized in July 2018 and the company is currently named Bancontact Payconiq Company. The new company got a capital injection of €17,6 million of its five major shareholders Belfius, BNP Paribas Fortis, ING, KBC and AXA. It then also merged its two existing payment apps called 'Payconiq' and 'Bancontact' into one app called 'Payconiq by Bancontact' which is supported by 20 Belgian banks and 290.000 stores in Belgium.

In 2019, the Payconiq payment solution was integrated in KBC's mobile bank app, followed by ING Belgium, in 2020.

The Netherlands 
Payconiq Netherlands was established in 2018, when the Payconiq mobile payment app was launched into the market, having as shareholders the main Dutch banks:  ASN Bank, ING, Rabobank, Regiobank and SNS. The service is scheduled to be discontinued on 1 January 2022 because the supporting banks chose to focus their efforts on the competing IDEAL service.

System 
The Payconiq platform connects banks, merchants, payment service providers and consumers, to enable omni-channel payments online, in store, by invoice or peer-to-peer. It is an API-based platform, allowing for a fast connection and value-added services.  

Consumers can download one of the stand-alone apps or use the Payconiq integration in their mobile banking apps (where available), according to their country of residence. They connect their bank account to the app and then are able to make payments to affiliated merchants by scanning a QR-code, or to friends (by e-mail address or cellphone number).

References

External links 
 Official website

Mobile payments
Online payments
Android (operating system) software
IOS software
Cross-platform software